The Rock Springs Rocket-Miner is the daily newspaper of Rock Springs and Sweetwater County in southwestern Wyoming. Published Tuesday-Saturday, the newspaper had previous names until 1965, when it adapted the current Daily Rocket-Miner. The paper expanded into a two-story building in 1974.

History
The newspaper was founded in Green River in the early 1880s as the Sweetwater Gazette by the former Scotland soccer international, Robert Smith. In 1887, he relocated the newspaper to Rock Springs, renaming it the Rock Springs Miner.

In 1937, David G. Richardson purchased the Rocket-Miner and moved to Rock Springs from his previous residence in Newcastle, the seat of Weston County in northeastern Wyoming. He continued as the paper's publisher until his death.

Charles Richardson's role
After his death, David Richardson's son, Charles (1934-2009), was elevated from general manager to publisher and president of the corporation's board of directors. Richardson used his leadership role at the newspaper to promote economic progress in Sweetwater County, including expanded infrastructure, the establishment of a new hospital, and the expansion of Western Wyoming Community College. He was appointed by Democratic Governor Michael J. Sullivan to the Wyoming Unemployment Compensation Commission.

Robert H. Johnson, later a state senator from Rock Springs, worked for the Richardsons as managing editor and general manager of the Daily Rocket-Miner from 1948 to 1961.

The Rocket-Miner has a circulation of some 5,000 daily copies throughout southwestern Wyoming. It is located at 215 D Street in Rock Springs.

Web presence
News site rocketminer.com allows access to national news links, classified advertising, obituaries, and legal notices. Most of the local news is not accessible through the website without a subscription.

References

Newspapers published in Wyoming
Sweetwater County, Wyoming
Rock Springs, Wyoming